Henning Larsen may refer to
Henning Larsen (1925–2013), Danish architect, founder of Henning Larsen Architects
Henning Larsen (athlete) (1910–2011), Danish marathon runner
Henning Larsen (cyclist, born 1931), Danish Olympic cyclist
Henning Larsen (cyclist, born 1955), Danish Olympic cyclist
Henning Larsen (linguist), American professor at the University of Iowa
Henning Larsen (football player, born 1944), Danish football player
Henning Larsen (football player, born 1961), Danish football player
Henning Sinding-Larsen (1904–1994), Norwegian journalist
Henning Holck-Larsen (1907–2003), Danish engineer, co-founder of Larsen & Toubro